The Gummidipoondi block is a revenue block in the Tiruvallur district of Tamil Nadu, India. It has a total of 61 panchayat villages.

References 
 

Revenue blocks in Tiruvallur district